Theyab Awana Ahmed Husain Al Messabi (‎ 8 April 1990 – 25 September 2011), or simply Theyab Awana, was an Emirati professional footballer who played as a winger for UAE Pro League club Baniyas and the United Arab Emirates national team. His playing style and ability drew comparisons to former Emirati international Zuhair Bakhit.

International career

Youth
Theyab played for the United Arab Emirates (UAE) in the first match of the 2009 FIFA U-20 World Cup, against South Africa. 2–0 down in the 90th minute of play, Hamdan Al Kamali converted a penalty to make the score 2–1 in the first minute of stoppage time; Theyab scored from a cross from Ahmed Ali to snatch a last-minute equalizer before the final whistle a few seconds later.

Senior
Theyab was brought to worldwide fame for the penalty kick scored with a back-heel in a friendly match against Lebanon on 17 July 2011. In the 78th minute, with the score at 5–2, a penalty was given to the UAE. Theyab took the penalty and, halfway through his path to the ball, he turned around and kicked the ball into the goal with his right heel. The coach reacted badly on the effort, and Theyab was immediately subbed off for the bad reception he received for the penalty. The incident was brought to prominence after a video of the effort was put on YouTube, and currently has over 2,800,000 views. The match ended 6–2 for the UAE.

Death and legacy
Awana died on 25 September 2011, aged 21, in a car accident in Abu Dhabi, United Arab Emirates. According to reports, the accident happened at the Sheikh Zayed Bridge when he was returning to Abu Dhabi from Al Ain after the end of a training session for the national team. The report stated he was using his phone at the time of the accident. Awana died at the scene. Rumors appeared that stated that his brother was with him in the car during the time of the accident, and entered the intensive care unit before dying several hours later. However, Baniyas Club denied this rumor.

He was buried on 26 September 2011, immediately after the Asr prayer, in the Baniyas Cemetery in Shamkha, Abu Dhabi. A month after Awana's death, the United Arab Emirates Football Association renamed its new stadium in Dubai the "Theyab Awana Stadium"; a mosque in the Kuwait Football Association Stadium was also named after him.

Career statistics

Club

International 

 Scores and results list the United Arab Emirates's goal tally first, score column indicates score after each Awana goal.

Honours
Baniyas
UAE Division 2 Group A: 2008–09
United Arab Emitates U17
GCC U-17 Championship: 2006
United Arab Emirates U19
AFC U-19 Championship: 2008
United Arab Emirates U23
GCC U-23 Championship: 2010
Asian Games Silver Medal: 2010

References

External links

 
 
 
 
 

1990 births
2011 deaths
People from Abu Dhabi
Emirati footballers
Association football wingers
Baniyas Club players
UAE First Division League players
UAE Pro League players
United Arab Emirates youth international footballers
United Arab Emirates international footballers
2011 AFC Asian Cup players
Footballers at the 2010 Asian Games
Medalists at the 2010 Asian Games
Asian Games medalists in football
Asian Games silver medalists for the United Arab Emirates
Road incident deaths in the United Arab Emirates